Zajelšje is a village in the hills west of Ilirska Bistrica in the Inner Carniola region of Slovenia.

The local church in the settlement is dedicated to Saint Barbara and belongs to the Parish of Pregarje.

References

External links
Zajelšje on Geopedia

Populated places in the Municipality of Ilirska Bistrica